OB or Ob may refer to:

Arts and entertainment
 Sam "O.B." O'Brien, a fictional character in the British soap opera Hollyoaks
 Orphan Black, a popular Canadian science fiction television show.
 Ob, a fictional currency in The Great Explosion

Businesses and organizations
 Odense Boldklub, a Danish football club
 Oriental Brewery, a South Korean brewery, which produces the OB lagers
 Outward Bound, an international outdoor education organization
 Astrakhan Airlines (IATA code) (defunct)
 Boliviana de Aviación (IATA code)

People
 Ed O'Bradovich, a former Chicago Bears defensive lineman and current Bears postgame host on 670 the Score
 Old Badmintonians, former pupils of Badminton School, Bristol, England
 Old Bedfordians, former pupils of Bedford School, England
 Old Bristolians, former pupils of Bristol Grammar School, England
 Obsolete Black, also known as Serena Williams.
 Oğuz Bağran, a maths teacher in Edirne Süleyman Demirel Science High School, Turkey.

Places 
 Ob (river), a river in West Siberia, Russia
 Ob Sea, an artificial lake on the river Ob 
 Ob, Russia, a town in Novosibirsk Oblast, Russia
 Ob, Germany, in Bidingen, Bavaria, Germany
 Gulf of Ob, a bay of the Arctic Ocean in Northern Russia
 Oak Bluffs, Massachusetts
 Ocean Beach, San Diego, a neighborhood of San Diego, California, United States

Science and technology
 OB star, in astronomy, a hot, massive star of spectral types O or B 
 Object Manager (Windows), a Windows NT subsystem
 Obstetrics, a medical specialty dealing with childbirth, often used in "obstetrics and gynaecology" (abbreviated OB/GYN)
 Oligonucleotide/Oligosaccharide DNA-Binding-fold domain
 Organizational behavior, an academic field
 Outside broadcasting, a television broadcasting from a mobile television studio, such as a van
Obliterative bronchiolitis, a disease that results in obstruction of the smallest airways of the lungs due to inflammation

Other uses
 ob., died, from Latin obitus. Also ob. inf. (died in infancy), ob. inf. Set. (died as minor), ob. inn. (died a spinster), ob. juv. (died in childhood)
 o.b. (brand), a brand of feminine hygiene products
 Halfpenny (British pre-decimal coin), from "ob", archaic abbreviation (see, e.g., Shakespeare's Henry IV, Part One, II.iv.539)
 Order of Burma
 "Over-the-counter bulletin board", in stock listings
 Organizational behavior
 Order of battle
 "Out of bounds", an area outside the course play area, in golf

See also
 Obi (disambiguation)
 Obie (disambiguation)
 OOB (disambiguation)